Kartal (Turkish: Eagle) is a Turkish masculine given name and a surname. People with the name include:

Given name 
 Kartal Demirağ, Turkish failed assassin
 Kartal Özmızrak (born 1995), Turkish basketball player
 Kartal Tibet (1939–2021), Turkish actor and film director
 Kartal Yılmaz (born 2000), Turkish football player

Surname 
 Ayhan Kartal (1966–2000), Turkish rapist and child killer
 Erhan Kartal (born 1993), Turkish football player
 Erhan Can Kartal (born 1998), Turkish actor
 Hüseyin Kartal (born 1982), Turkish football player
 İsmail Kartal (born 1961), Turkish football manager and former football player
 Kazım Kartal (1936–2003), Turkish actor
 Nemanja Kartal (born 1994), Montenegrin football player
 Sonay Kartal (born 2001), British tennis player
 Şaban Kartal (1952–1998), Yugoslav-born Turkish football player.

Turkish masculine given names
Turkish-language surnames